The 15033 / 34 Haridwar - Ramnagar Intercity Express is an Express train belonging to Indian Railways North Eastern Railway zone that runs between  and  in India.

Coaches
The 15033 / 34 Haridwar - Ramnagar Intercity Express has two AC Chair Car,  ten Non AC chair car, six general unreserved & two SLR (seating with luggage rake) coaches . It does not carry a pantry car coach.

As is customary with most train services in India, coach composition may be amended at the discretion of Indian Railways depending on demand.

Service

Routing

Traction
As the route is going to be electrified, a   based WDM-3A diesel locomotive pulls the train to its destination.

References

External links
15033 Intercity Express at India Rail Info
15034 Intercity Express at India Rail Info

Intercity Express (Indian Railways) trains
Rail transport in Uttarakhand
Trains from Haridwar